Milan Janjušević (born 9 April 1983) is a Serbian professional basketball player who last played for Kolubara LA 2003 of the Basketball League of Serbia.

He also played for Gradjanski of the Bosnian League.

References

External links

1983 births
Living people
Basketball League of Serbia players
KK Beopetrol/Atlas Beograd players
KK Crnokosa players
KK Kolubara players
KK Mladost SP players
KK Tamiš players
KK Radnički KG 06 players
KK Zdravlje players
KK Žarkovo players
People from Prijepolje
Serbian expatriate basketball people in Bosnia and Herzegovina
Serbian expatriate basketball people in Romania
Serbian expatriate basketball people in Slovenia
Serbian expatriate basketball people in North Macedonia
Serbian men's basketball players
Small forwards